Carol Gould may refer to:

 Carol Gould (writer) (1953–2021), American writer and broadcaster based in the United Kingdom
 Carol Gould (athlete) (born 1944), retired long-distance runner from England
 Carol C. Gould, Hunter College and CUNY Graduate Center